AYW may refer to:

 A sub-type of Hepatitis B virus surface antigen
 Aberystwyth railway station (National Rail code: AYW), a railway station in the United Kingdom
 Ayawasi Airport (IATA code: AYW), an airport in Indonesia